Marshall County is a county located in the U.S. state of Tennessee. As of the 2020 census, the population was 34,318. Its county seat is Lewisburg. Marshall County comprises the Lewisburg Micropolitan Statistical Area, which is also included in the Nashville-Davidson–Murfreesboro–Franklin, TN Metropolitan Statistical Area. It is in Middle Tennessee, one of the three Grand Divisions of the state.

The Tennessee Walking Horse Breeders' and Exhibitors' Association is based here. In addition, the fainting goat is another animal breed developed here.  To celebrate this unique breed, the county holds an annual festival known as "Goats, Music and More," drawing visitors from around the world.

History
Marshall County was created in 1836 from parts of Giles, Bedford, Lincoln and Maury counties.  Marshall County was originally to be named Cannon County. Due to a clerical error at the time of formation in 1836 the names of Marshall and Cannon Counties, both formed in 1836, were accidentally swapped and never corrected. It was named after the American jurist, John Marshall, Chief Justice of the U.S. Supreme Court.

The economy was based on agriculture in the antebellum years and well into the twentieth century. Planters had depended on the labor of enslaved African Americans to work the commodity crops of tobacco and hemp, as well as care for thoroughbred horses and other quality livestock. The breed known as the Tennessee Walking Horse was developed here.

After the war, blacks and whites struggled to adjust to emancipation and a free labor market. Freedmen founded Needmore as a community in Marshall County after the Civil War where they could live as neighbors and be relatively free of white supervision.

Whites committed violence against freedmen to re-establish and maintain dominance after the war. In the period after Reconstruction and into the early 20th century, whites in Marshall County committed eight lynchings of African Americans. This was the fifth-highest total of any county in the state, but three other counties, including two nearby, also had eight lynchings each.

Among these lynchings were the murders of John Milligan (also spelled Millikin) and John L. Hunter in the Needmore settlement near the county seat of Lewisburg in August 1903. Governor James B. Frazier offered a reward for information, as Whitecaps were blamed for the deaths, and the state was trying to eliminate this secret, vigilante group. In the early 20th century, numerous African Americans left the county during the period of the Great Migration to northern and midwestern industrial cities for work.

Three Tennessee governors— Henry Horton, Jim Nance McCord, and Buford Ellington— were each living in Marshall County at the time of their election as governor.

Geography
The Duck River drains much of the county.

Adjacent counties
Rutherford County (northeast)
Bedford County (east)
Lincoln County (southeast)
Giles County (southwest)
Maury County (west)
Williamson County (northwest)

State protected areas
Henry Horton State Park
Wilson School Road Forest and Cedar Glades State Natural Area

Demographics

2020 census

As of the 2020 United States census, there were 34,318 people, 12,324 households, and 8,624 families residing in the county.

2000 census
As of the census of 2000, there were 26,767 people, 10,307 households, and 7,472 families residing in the county.  The population density was 71 people per square mile (28/km2).  There were 11,181 housing units at an average density of 30 per square mile (12/km2).  The racial makeup of the county was 89.42% White, 7.77% Black or African American, 0.25% Native American, 0.31% Asian, 0.01% Pacific Islander, 1.46% from other races, and 0.77% from two or more races.  2.87% of the population were Hispanic or Latino of any race.

There were 10,307 households, out of which 33.80% had children under the age of 18 living with them, 56.80% were married couples living together, 11.60% had a female householder with no husband present, and 27.50% were non-families. 23.90% of all households were made up of individuals, and 10.00% had someone living alone who was 65 years of age or older.  The average household size was 2.56 and the average family size was 3.02.

In the county, the population was spread out, with 25.60% under the age of 18, 8.70% from 18 to 24, 29.90% from 25 to 44, 23.20% from 45 to 64, and 12.60% who were 65 years of age or older.  The median age was 36 years. For every 100 females there were 95.40 males.  For every 100 females age 18 and over, there were 92.90 males.

The median income for a household in the county was $38,457, and the median income for a family was $45,731. Males had a median income of $31,876 versus $22,362 for females. The per capita income for the county was $17,749.  About 7.30% of families and 10.00% of the population were below the poverty line, including 10.80% of those under age 18 and 13.10% of those age 65 or over.

Communities

City
Lewisburg (county seat)

Towns
Chapel Hill
Cornersville
Petersburg (partial)

Unincorporated communities

Archer
Beasley
Belfast
Caney Spring
Cochran
Delina
Farmington
Graball
Holts Corner
Lunns Store
Milltown
Mooresville
Rich Creek
Robertson Fork
Silver Creek
South Berlin
Verona
Yell

Politics

The county's political history is similar to the vast majority of Middle Tennessee, where it was a solidly Democratic county throughout the first half of the 20th century, but began making shifts to the Republican Party starting in the 1970s, and is now an overwhelmingly red county like almost all of Tennessee.

One notable result in this county came in the 1928 election, when Herbert Hoover and Al Smith tied the county with a total of 735 votes apiece.

See also
National Register of Historic Places listings in Marshall County, Tennessee

References

External links

Official site
Marshall County Chamber of Commerce
Tennessee Walking Horse Breeders' and Exhibitors' Association
Annual Fainting Goat Festival
 Marshall County, TNGenWeb - free genealogy resources for the county

 
1836 establishments in Tennessee
Populated places established in 1836
Middle Tennessee